WQBQ (1410 AM) is a commercial radio station broadcasting a Soft Oldies radio format. Licensed to Leesburg, Florida, the station serves Central Florida. It is currently owned by James and Patricia Floyd, through licensee Floyd Media Radio, Inc.

By day, WQBQ transmits 5,000 watts, but to avoid interfering with other stations on 1410 AM, it greatly reduces power to 88 watts at night. It has been granted a construction permit to add an FM translator at 96.1 MHz.

History
In 1962, the station signed on as WBIL. It was originally a daytimer, required to be off the air at night. The call sign was changed to WZST in 1966, playing country music.

The station became WINF on October 7, 1985. Less than a year later on September 22, 1986, the station changed its call sign to WQBQ. The next call sign change occurred on September 7, 2009, when it became WRHB only to revert to WQBQ on December 10, 2010.

References

External links

QBQ
Soft adult contemporary radio stations in the United States
Oldies radio stations in the United States
Leesburg, Florida
1962 establishments in Florida
Radio stations established in 1962